Kurki is a Finnish surname. Notable people with the surname include:

 Matti Kurki, legendary Finnish chieftain
 Mikael Kurki (born 1987), Finnish ice hockey player
 Ville Kurki (born 1968), Finnish sailor

Finnish-language surnames
fr:Kurki